Jack Hill State Park, formerly named Gordonia-Alatamaha State Park, is a  Georgia state park located in Reidsville, a city on Georgia's coastal plain region. The park is known for having a dramatic history, having been previously under water for nearly 20 million years. Until about 1 million years ago, the area was very similar to the dense jungles and plains of Africa. The park was named for the nearby Altamaha River and the park's nearly extinct Gordonia Tree. The park contains a  lake stocked with fish, as well as a 9-hole golf course, named Brazell's Creek, which has recently been upgraded to 18 holes.

In 2020, the park was renamed from Gordonia-Alatamaha to Jack Hill, honoring the late Georgia senator who did much for the community. Hill was instrumental in bringing many facilities to the park, including its group shelter, cabins, splash pad, expanded golf course and more.

Facilities
26 Tent/Trailer/RV Sites
8 Cottages
1 Walk-In Campsite
18-Hole Golf Course
Water Pad
4 Picnic Shelters
1 Group Shelter
Miniature Golf Course
Pedal Boat, Aquacycle and Paddleboard Rental
Fishing Boat Rental

Annual events
Golf Tournament (April)

References

External links

Georgia State Parks

State parks of Georgia (U.S. state)
Protected areas of Tattnall County, Georgia